Stafford Alois Repp (April 26, 1918November 5, 1974) was an American actor best known for his role as Police Chief Miles Clancy O'Hara on ABC's Batman television series.

Career
Soon after the December 7, 1941 attack on Pearl Harbor, he served a stint in the United States Army Air Corps during World War II. He was active in performing in and producing shows while he was in the Army Air Corps. After his military service, he began his acting career.

Repp acted in stage productions on the West Coast before World War II.

At the beginning of his film career, Repp appeared in numerous film and TV productions including the films I Want to Live! (1958) with Susan Hayward, and The Brothers Karamazov, both made in 1958. Also at this same time he began to appear in a string of early television programs from the middle 1950s to the early 1960s, including NBC's western anthology series Frontier and the Barry Sullivan/Clu Gulager western, The Tall Man.

Repp appeared on Rod Cameron's State Trooper, Barbara Eden's How to Marry a Millionaire, Peter Lawford's The Thin Man (1957), Tom Tryon's Texas John Slaughter (1958), Rex Allen's Frontier Doctor (1959), Rawhide (1959), Howard Duff's Dante (1961), Walter Brennan's The Real McCoys (1957 and 1959), Gunsmoke (1957 & 1960), The Donna Reed Show (1960), Guestward, Ho! (1960), Angel (1961), and Dennis the Menace (1962 and 1963). He appeared as Joe Melvin, a plumber, in the 1963 episode of The Lucy Show, "Lucy and Viv Put in a Shower".

Repp made four appearances on Perry Mason between 1959 and 1962 in minor roles, including Private Investigator Phillip Morgan in "The Case of the Petulant Partner."

From 1963 to 1964, he portrayed Brink, the factory supervisor on Phil Silvers' The New Phil Silvers Show. His series co-stars were Buddy Lester, Herbie Faye, Elena Verdugo, Ronnie Dapo, and Sandy Descher.

Repp made appearances in The Twilight Zone episodes "Nick of Time" which starred William Shatner; a supporting role in "The Grave" with a cast which consisted of Lee Marvin, Lee Van Cleef, Strother Martin, James Best, and Elen Willard; then finally in "Caesar and Me."

In early 1966, he appeared as a railroad detective in an episode in the last season of My Favorite Martian.

In 1966, he started  his stint as Chief O'Hara on Batman. While on Batman, he appeared as a guest in numerous other television programs, including Love American Style, I Dream of Jeannie and The Mothers-in-Law, in the latter once again playing a policeman.

His last released film was Linda Lovelace for President in 1975. He had a posthumous appearance in Mannix that was first broadcast two months after his death. His last television appearance was on the TV show M*A*S*H (as a Military Police Officer) that was first broadcast four months after his death. Shortly before his death in 1974, he filmed several scenes for Orson Welles' unfinished film The Other Side of the Wind, which was not completed and released until 2018.

Personal life
Repp was married and had five children.

Death and legacy
Repp died at age 56 on November 5, 1974, in Inglewood, California.

He is interred at Westminster Memorial Park in Westminster, California. After his death, his sister, a television writer, established the Stafford Repp Memorial Scholarship for alumni of his alma mater, Lowell High School.

Selected TV and filmography

 Fireman Save My Child (1954) - Emma's Third Coachman (uncredited)
 Shield for Murder (1954) - Detective O'Dell (uncredited)
 Down Three Dark Streets (1954) - Boxing Manager (uncredited)
 Black Tuesday (1954) - Bert Posmonick (uncredited)
 Unchained (1955) - Mr. Miller, Prison Welding Supervisor (uncredited)
 Big House, U.S.A. (1955) - Prison Warden Machek (uncredited)
 Strange Lady in Town (1955) - Macaneer (uncredited)
 The Shrike (1955) - Fleming (uncredited)
 Not as a Stranger (1955) - Orientation Doctor (uncredited)
 Man with the Gun (1955) - Arthur Jackson (uncredited)
 The Killer Is Loose (1956) - State Police Capt. Lyle Snow (uncredited)
 The Steel Jungle (1956) - Beakeley
 The Price of Fear (1956) - Johnny McNab
 The Harder They Fall (1956) - Reporter (uncredited)
 Star in the Dust (1956) - Leo Roos
 Canyon River (1956) - Bartender (uncredited)
 The Boss (1956) - Earl Bentley (uncredited)
 Plunder Road (1957) - Roly Adams
 Gunsmoke (1957) - Charlie Brewer
 The Green-Eyed Blonde (1957) - Bill Prell (uncredited)
 The Brothers Karamazov (1958) - Innkeeper (uncredited)
 Hot Spell (1958) - Baggage Man (uncredited)
 As Young as We Are (1958) - John (uncredited)
 Gunsmoke (1958) - Mr. Hightower
 I Want to Live! (1958) - Police Sgt.
 Official Detective (1958, Episode: "Hijackers") - Hank Coles
 The Walter Winchell File (1958, Episode: "David & Goliath") - Benny Getzler
 The Californians (NBC-TV, 1959, TV Series) - Amos Dayton 
 The Crimson Kimono (1959) - City Librarian (uncredited)
 Richard Diamond, Private Detective in "The Popskull" (1960)
 Hennesey (1959-1961, TV Series) - Charley London
 The Twilight Zone (CBS-TV, 1960)
 Gunsmoke (1960) - Styles
 The DuPont Show with June Allyson in "The Way Home" (CBS-TV, 1960) - Jesse 
 The Explosive Generation (1961) - Police Captain
 Bonanza (1960-1961, three episodes) - Mine Owner / Sheriff Brady / Carter
 The New Phil Silvers Show (1963) - Brink
 Our Man Higgins (1962, in the episode, "The Rules of the Road") - Buckmaster
 The Lucy Show (1963), Joe Melvin in the episode "Lucy and Viv Put in a Shower"
 The Lucy Show (1964), Counterman in the episode "Lucy Is a Process Server"
 A Tiger Walks (1964) - Mr. Blonden, City Editor (uncredited)
 Gunsmoke (1965) - Otie Schaffer
 A Very Special Favor (1965) - Bartender
 Batman (1966–1968, TV Series) - Chief O'Hara
 Batman (1966) - Chief O'Hara
 Love American Style (TV Series) (1969) - Superintendent
 Gunsmoke (1972) - Sheriff Tanner
 Cycle Psycho (1973)
 Linda Lovelace for President (1975) - Dirty Old Man
 The Other Side of the Wind (2018) - Al Denny (Stock Footage)

References

External links

 

1918 births
1974 deaths
American male film actors
American male television actors
Male actors from San Francisco
United States Army Air Forces soldiers
United States Army Air Forces personnel of World War II
20th-century American male actors
Western (genre) television actors